Ernest Casimir of Nassau-Weilburg (15 November 1607 – 16 April 1655) was the founder of the younger line of Nassau-Weilburg.

He was a son of Louis II, Count of Nassau-Weilburg and his wife Anna Maria of Hesse-Kassel (1567–1626).

Life 
He was born in Saarbrücken.

His father, Louis II, had been able to unite all the territories of Walram branch of Nassau.  After his death in 1627, the territories were divided among four brothers, with William Louis, the oldest, acting as regent for the youngest two.  When Otto, the youngest died in 1632, and Ernest Casimir came of age, the three surviving brothers divided the territory anew.  The oldest, William Louis, received Nassau-Saarbrücken, John received Idstein and Ernest Casimir received Weilburg, Merenberg, Gleiberg, Hüttenberg, Reichelsheim, Kirchheim, Stauf, Bolanden and parts of Homburg

Ernest Casimir did not spend much time in his own territory.  In 1634, he had to flee from the Thirty Years' War.  He fled to Metz and returned after the 1648 Peace of Westphalia.  Even after the peace had been signed, it took a while before all rightful rulers had been restored to power.

During this period, the brothers concluded the Treaty of Gotha of 16 July 1651, in which division of 1632 was confirmed and again adjusted.

He died in Weilburg.

Marriage and issue 
In 1634 Ernest Casimir married Anna Maria of Sayn-Wittgenstein-Hachenburg (1610–1656). She was the daughter of Count William II of Sayn-Wittgenstein-Hachenburg (1569–1623). The couple had the following children:
 William Louis (1634–1636)
 Marie Eleonore (1636–1678), married Count Casimir of Eberstein (d. 1660)
 Casimir (1638–1639)
 Frederick (1640–1675), married Christiane Elisabeth of Sayn-Wittgenstein-Homburg (1646–1678), daughter of Count Ernest of Sayn-Wittgenstein-Homburg (1599–1649)

Ancestors

Footnotes 

Counts of Nassau
House of Nassau
1607 births
1655 deaths
Burials in the Royal Crypt of Weilburg Schlosskirche